AD 10 (X) was a common year starting on Wednesday (link will display the full calendar) of the Julian calendar. At the time, throughout the Roman Empire it was known as the year of the consulship of Dolabella and Silanus (or, less frequently, year 763 ab urbe condita). The denomination AD 10 for this year has been used since the early medieval period, when the Anno Domini calendar era became the prevalent method in Europe for counting years.

Events

By place

Roman Empire 

 Differentiation of localized Teutonic tribes of the Irminones.
 Senatus consultum Silanianum is adopted.

Central Asia 
 The Greek dynasty in Bactria is brought to an end.

China 
 The usurper Wang Mang (who rules during a brief interregnum known as the Xin Dynasty) outlaws the private purchase and use of crossbows. Despite this, Liu Xiu, the later Emperor Guangwu of Han, buys crossbows in the winter of AD 22 to aid the rebellion of his brother Liu Yan (styled Bosheng) and Li Tong.

Judea 
 According to the Gospel of Luke, Jesus visits Herod's Temple and gets lost.

By topic

Arts 

 Ovid completes Tristia III (the "Sorrows") describing the sadness of banishment.

Births 

 Hero of Alexandria, Greek engineer (d. c. AD 70)
 Pope Linus, Pope in Catholic church (d. AD 76)
 Liu Penzi, Chinese puppet emperor (d. after AD 27)
 Lucius Vipstanus Poplicola, Roman consul (d. after AD 59)
 Tigellinus, Roman Praetorian prefect (d. AD 69)

Deaths 

 Didymus Chalcenterus, Greek scholar and grammarian (b. c. 63 BC)

 Hillel the Elder, Babylonian sage, scholar, and Jewish leader (b. c. 110 BC)

References 

 

als:10er#10